Ignacio Trelles Campos (31 July 1916 – 24 March 2020) was a Mexican football player and manager. As a player with Club Necaxa, they won three Mexican championships. Later he coached amongst others the Mexico national team.

A seasoned and decorated manager, Trelles managed 1083 club matches, with 463 wins, 319 draws and 301 losses. He took Cruz Azul to consecutive México Primera División (Mexico First Division) championships, 1979 and 1980; a feat the team has yet to repeat.

Early life
Trelles was born in Guadalajara. As a child, he was very athletic, engaging in many different sports.  In his teenage years, Trelles's family relocated to San Miguel Chapultepec where he regularly played football in the streets.

Club career
Trelles made his senior debut with Club Necaxa in 1934. The club won the Mexican Primera División three times, in 1934–35, 1936–37 and 1937–38 and the Copa MX once, in 1934–35. 

In 1943, after nine years at Necaxa, Trelles joined the ranks of Club América and played with the Las Águilas (The Eagles) for three years before moving to C.F. Monterrey in 1946. In 1948 he played in the United States with the Chicago Vikings. He retired from playing in February 1948 with Atlante F.C., having suffered a fractured tibia and fibula in his right leg.

Coaching career
He had seven tenures as coach of the Mexico national football team in 106 international matches and was in charge of the Mexico squads at two FIFA World Cup tournaments: 1962 and 1966. He guided Mexico to their first win in a FIFA World Cup when they defeated Czechoslovakia 3–1 in the 1962 FIFA World Cup in Chile. At the 1962 FIFA World Cup, Mexico finished eleventh, which was their best ranking in a World Cup outside home soil until 2002 where they also ranked eleventh.

Later life
Trelles turned 100 in July 2016. He died of a heart attack on 24 March 2020 at the age of 103, in Mexico City.

Honours

Player
Necaxa
Mexican Primera División: 1934–35, 1936–37, 1937–38
Copa México: 1934–35

Manager
Marte
Mexican Primera División: 1953–54

Zacatepec
Mexican Primera División: 1954–55, 1957–58

Toluca
Mexican Primera División: 1966–67, 1967–68
CONCACAF Champions' Cup: 1968

Cruz Azul
Mexican Primera División: 1978–79, 1979–80

Atlante
CONCACAF Champions' Cup: 1983

Mexico
CONCACAF Championship: 1965

References

External links
 
Official Mexico national team coaching statistics

1916 births
2020 deaths
Footballers from Guadalajara, Jalisco
1962 FIFA World Cup managers
1966 FIFA World Cup managers
Men centenarians
Mexican centenarians
Association football midfielders
Mexican footballers
Mexican expatriate footballers
Expatriate soccer players in the United States
Mexican expatriate sportspeople in the United States
Club Necaxa footballers
Club América footballers
C.F. Monterrey players
Chicago Vikings players
North American Soccer Football League players
Atlante F.C. footballers
Mexican football managers
Mexico national football team managers
Cruz Azul managers
Deportivo Toluca F.C. managers